2-Hydroxy-4-methoxybenzaldehyde is a chemical compound and an isomer of vanillin.  Urolithin M7, one of the urolithins, has also been synthesized from 2-hydroxy-4-methoxybenzaldehyde using the inverse electron-demand Diels–Alder reaction.

See also
 Vanillin
 2-Hydroxy-5-methoxybenzaldehyde
 Isovanillin
 ortho-Vanillin

References 

Hydroxybenzaldehydes